The Pritzker Architecture Prize is an international architecture award presented annually "to honor a living architect or architects whose built work demonstrates a combination of those qualities of talent, vision and commitment, which has produced consistent and significant contributions to humanity and the built environment through the art of architecture.” Founded in 1979 by Jay A. Pritzker and his wife Cindy, the award is funded by the Pritzker family and sponsored by the Hyatt Foundation. It is considered to be one of the world's premier architecture prizes, and is often referred to as the Nobel Prize of architecture.

The Pritzker Architecture Prize claims to be awarded "irrespective of nationality, race, creed, or ideology". The recipients receive US$100,000, a citation certificate, and, since 1987, a bronze medallion. The designs on the medal are inspired by the work of architect Louis Sullivan, while the Latin inspired inscription on the reverse of the medallion—firmitas, utilitas, venustas (English: firmness, commodity and delight)—is from Ancient Roman architect Vitruvius. Before 1987, a limited edition Henry Moore sculpture accompanied the monetary prize.

The Executive Director of the prize, Manuela Lucá-Dazio, solicits nominations from a range of people, including past Laureates, academics, critics and others "with expertise and interest in the field of architecture". Any licensed architect can also make a personal application for the prize before November 1 every year. (In 1988 Gordon Bunshaft nominated himself for the award and eventually won it.) The jury, consisting of five to nine "experts ... recognized professionals in their own fields of architecture, business, education, publishing, and culture", deliberates and early in the following year announce the winner. The prize Chair is the 2016 Pritzker laureate Alejandro Aravena; earlier chairs were J. Carter Brown (1979–2002), the Lord Rothschild (2003–2004), the Lord Palumbo (2005–2015), Glenn Murcutt (2016–2018) and Stephen Breyer (2019-2020).

Laureates 

Inaugural winner Philip Johnson was cited "for 50 years of imagination and vitality embodied in a myriad of museums, theaters, libraries, houses, gardens and corporate structures". The 2004 laureate Zaha Hadid was the first female prize winner. Ryue Nishizawa became the youngest winner in 2010 at age 44. Partners in architecture (in 2001, Jacques Herzog and Pierre de Meuron, in 2010, Kazuyo Sejima and Ryue Nishizawa, in 2020, Yvonne Farrell and Shelley McNamara, and in 2021, Anne Lacaton and Jean-Philippe Vassal) have shared the award. In 1988, Gordon Bunshaft and Oscar Niemeyer were both separately honored with the award.  The 2017 winners, architects Rafael Aranda, Carme Pigem, and Ramón Vilalta  were the first group of three to share the prize.

Table notes 
 A.  Roche was born in Ireland.
 B.  Pei was born in China.
 C.  Gehry was born in Canada.
 D.  Hadid was born in Iraq.
 E.  Rogers was born in Italy into an Anglo-Italian family.
 F.   Posthumous award.
 G.   Ceremony held online due to the COVID-19 pandemic.
 H.   Kéré was born in Burkina Faso.

Criticism 
In 2013, the student organization "Women in Design" at the Harvard Graduate School of Design started a petition arguing Denise Scott Brown should receive joint recognition with her partner, Robert Venturi, who won the award in 1991. The petition, according to The New York Times, "reignited long-simmering tensions in the architectural world over whether women have been consistently denied the standing they deserve in a field whose most prestigious award was not given to a woman until 2004, when Zaha Hadid won". Scott Brown told CNN that "as a woman, she had felt excluded by the elite of architecture throughout her career," and that "the Pritzker Prize was based on the fallacy that great architecture was the work of a 'single lone male genius' at the expense of collaborative work." Responding to the petition, the prize jury said that it cannot revisit the decisions of past juries, either in the case of Scott Brown or that of Lu Wenyu, whose husband Wang Shu won in 2012. The 2020 Pritzker jury said in its citation awarding the prize to Yvonne Farrell and Shelley McNamara – making them the fourth and fifth women to ever be awarded the prize – that they were, "pioneers in a field that has traditionally been and still is a male-dominated profession [and] beacons to others as they forge their exemplary professional path."

See also 

 Driehaus Architecture Prize
 List of architecture awards
 List of prizes known as the Nobel of a field or the highest honors of a field

References 
General
 

Specific

External links 

 

Architecture awards
Awards established in 1979
 
Pritzker family
 International awards